Dravid is a surname found in the Deshastha Rigvedi Brahmin (DRB) community in the states of Maharashtra, Madhya Pradesh, Varanasi and Karnataka of India.

Notable people 
 Rahul Dravid, former captain of Indian national cricket team
Rahul Dravid: Timeless Steel, an anthological biography about the Indian cricketer Rahul Dravid.
List of awards and achievements of Rahul Dravid
 Rajeshwar Shastri Dravid, an Indian writer, scholar, grammarian and translator of Sanskrit literature.

Notes 

Indian surnames